Ron Simms is an American custom motorcycle builder, operating his business, Simms Custom Cycles, in Hayward, California. Simms has been building custom motorcycles for over 47 years. He has been featured in Easyriders magazine, and the photo essay book Art of the Chopper, where his work was compared to Arlen Ness as epitomizing the East Bay Style. In 2017 appeared in American M.C. Season 1 episode 1. Jesse James of West Coast Choppers apprenticed under Ron Simms.

Awards
Best Performance Machine Equipped Bike, 2009 Los Angeles Calendar Bike Show

References

Techno-Chop: The New Breed of Chopper Builders, Mike Seate, Simon Green and Steve Terry, p. 81, Motorbooks 2005,

External links

Motorcycle builders
Businesspeople from California
People from Hayward, California
Companies based in Hayward, California
Living people
Culture of Hayward, California
Year of birth missing (living people)